The truncated triakis icosahedron, or more precisely an order-10 truncated triakis icosahedron, is a convex polyhedron with 72 faces: 10 sets of 3 pentagons arranged in an icosahedral arrangement, with 12 decagons in the gaps.

Triakis icosahedron
It is constructed from taking a triakis icosahedron by truncating the order-10 vertices. This creates 12 regular decagon faces, and leaves 60 mirror-symmetric pentagons.

Decakis truncated dodecahedron 
The dual of the truncated triakis icosahedron is called a decakis truncated dodecahedron. It can be seen as a truncated dodecahedron with decagonal pyramids augmented to the faces.

See also
 Truncated triakis tetrahedron
 Truncated triakis octahedron
 Truncated tetrakis cube

External links 
 George Hart's Polyhedron generator - "t10kI" (Conway polyhedron notation)

Polyhedra
Truncated tilings